Hell Night is a 1981 American slasher film directed by Tom DeSimone, written by Randy Feldman, and starring Linda Blair. The film depicts a night of fraternity hazing set in an old manor, during which a deformed killer terrorizes and murders many of the college students. The plot blends elements of slasher films and haunted house-themed films. Director Chuck Russell served as an executive producer, while his long-time collaborator Frank Darabont served as a production assistant.

While reception was generally mixed, the film has developed a large cult following since its release. The film was nominated for a Razzie for Worst Actress for Blair. Hell Night was also the final film released by Compass International Pictures.

Plot
During a college costume party, Peter prepares to initiate four new pledges into Alpha Sigma Rho. The four consist of Jeff, a boy from an opulent upbringing, Marti, an intelligent girl from a poor background, Denise, a promiscuous, heavy drinking party-girl from England; and Seth, a stoner and surfer from California. The group are forced to spend the night in Garth Manor, an abandoned mansion once owned by a man named Raymond Garth, who murdered his wife Lillian and three deformed children Morris, Margaret and Suzanne. Following the murders, Garth hanged himself. While Garth had a fourth child, Andrew, his body was never found nor the body of Morris. The legend states that both Morris and Andrew still lurk within the mansion.

Peter and the rest of the students drive the four pledges up the mansion, leaving them alone at the gates. Seth and Denise leave Marti and Jeff alone to go have sex. The latter two discuss their contrasting backgrounds, before the windows in the parlor suddenly burst open and an apparition frightens Marti. In reality, Peter along with two other students, May and Scott, have set up scares all over the mansion to frighten the pledges. While walking around the side of the house, May is pulled down a hole, where she is murdered by an unseen assailant, who decapitates her. Following this, Scott is also murdered by the same figure on the roof. Peter attempts to prank Denise, but she is oblivious to his efforts. He goes to search for Scott, only to discover his body strung up on the roof. He flees and attempts to escape through the fence with his key, only to be attacked by an unknown assailant. He runs into a nearby hedge maze where he discovers a second assailant, who murders him with a scythe.

In the house, the four pledges quickly discover the tricks and pranks set up around the mansion for them. Seth and Denise return to the bedroom to have sex and consume drugs. Seth leaves Denise alone to use the restroom, only to return and discover May's severed head under the sheets. Panicked, Seth jumps the mansion gates to alert the police. Marti and Jeff also discover Scott's body. Marti locks herself in one of the bedrooms while Jeff goes to investigate a light in the hedge maze. He enters the maze, where he finds a pitchfork and Peter's remains. He flees back to the house to inform Marti of the murder, and the pair theorize that Andrew Garth could be behind the murders.

While their backs are turned, a large figure begins to emerge from the floor behind them. Armed with a pitchfork, Jeff wounds the assailant, who seemingly disappears. They remove the rug, only to discover a trapdoor through which the assailant has fled. The couple descends into the tunnels below, in which they discover Denise's corpse, along with the preserved remains of Garth's family members.

Seth finally arrives at the local police station, begging for help. The police do not take his claims seriously, believing him to be drunk or playing a fraternity prank, and threaten to arrest him. Seth pretends to leave the police station, only to take a shotgun and some shells, before escaping through a window. He carjacks a vehicle from a civilian, informing him that he is going to Garth Manor (hoping the police will follow him there, but they never do).

Back in the tunnels, a large and disfigured man appears and pursues Jeff and Marti. Jeff struggles with the man, who knocks him down a flight of steps, badly injuring him. Another killer appears, surprising the couple. The Garth brothers corner Marti and Jeff, but they are able to escape through a concealed door, fleeing back to the bedroom, using the pitchfork to bar the concealed door. Losing their only weapon.

Seth arrives back at the mansion, where he is ambushed by Morris Garth. They struggle, before Seth shoots him twice and apparently kills him. Alerted by the noise, Jeff and Marti meet him in the entryway of the mansion, where Andrew appears and attacks Seth, dragging him into an unlit corner of the room. Marti and Jeff are frightened by gunfire and Marti attempts to recover the shotgun. Andrew Garth emerges from the darkness and pursues Marti and Jeff through the house and back to the bedroom, where they barricade the door. Jeff urges Marti to escape out a window. Before he can follow suit, Andrew breaks through the door and hurls him to the ground below, killing him.

A frightened Marti enters the hedge maze, where she finds Peter's corpse. She pries the keys from his fingers, before escaping. She is able to get through the gates using the keys, and takes the time to relock them. She attempts to escape in Seth's stolen vehicle, but is ambushed by Andrew. He smashes the windshield and a struggle ensues, resulting in one of the spiked gates being knocked over, on which Andrew is impaled and dies.

Waking in the morning as the Sun rises over the mansion, Marti emerges from the car, and walks away.

Cast
 Linda Blair as Marti Gaines
 Peter Barton as Jeff Reed
 Vincent Van Patten as Seth
 Suki Goodwin as Denise Dunsmore
 Kevin Brophy as Peter Bennett
 Jimmy Sturtevant as Scott
 Jenny Neumann as May West
 Gloria Heilman as Party Girl
 Hal Ralston as Old Cop
 Carey Fox as Younger Cop
 Ron Gans as The Driver
 Jean Hasselhoff as Party Guest (uncredited)
 Nathan L. Truman as Fraternity Member (uncredited)

Production

Conception
Chuck Russell, who would later direct A Nightmare on Elm Street 3: Dream Warriors (1987), served as executive producer on the film. During the production, producer Bruce Cohn Curtis urged the filmmakers to implement an extended chase sequence for Linda Blair's character after seeing Jamie Lee Curtis's chase sequence in Terror Train (1980); this was the basis of the chase sequence that takes place in the tunnels under the mansion.

Filming

Filming Hell Night took 40 days in the fall and winter of 1980, between November 1980 and January 1981. The original shooting budget was a reported $1 million, but the shoot's duration through the holidays extended the budget an additional $400,000. The film's shooting schedule reportedly consisted of six-day weeks and was described as grueling. Star Linda Blair recalled the daily shoots lasting from 5:00a.m. to 11:00p.m., as well as spending Thanksgiving with the cast and crew on a double-decker bus rented by the producers. According to DeSimone, Peter Barton hurt himself on set, and as a result most of his limping in the movie was due to actual physical pain from the injury, rather than being acted.

The majority of the movie was shot in three locations: The exterior of Garth Manor was shot at the Kimberly Crest Mansion in Redlands, California. The hedge maze was brought in as there was no actual garden maze on the mansion property. The inside of Garth Manor was filmed in a residential home in Pasadena, California. The frat party was filmed in an apartment lobby in Los Angeles, California. The seemingly many tunnels in the movie were actually only two corridors through which the director had the actors repeatedly running from different angles.

Director De Simone stated he wanted a "classic Gothic look" for the film: "I don't like these horror films where people are walking around haunted houses wearing jeans and T-shirts. So we threw our heads together and I said I wanted Linda in a Gothic kind of wardrobe. And we came up with the idea to make the hell night party a costume party. And that way we were able to have everyone in those kinds of costumes that suited their personality."

The two actors who portrayed the Garth killers are not listed anywhere in the credits, although their real names are believed to be Valentino Richardson and Chad Butler. However, on the film's DVD commentary, it was noted that they are both German nationals who spoke little or no English, and that one of them (the middle-aged bearded man) died shortly after the release of the film.

Release

Theatrical distribution
Hell Night was given a limited release in the United States on August 7, 1981 by Compass International Pictures. Three weeks later, on August 28, 1981, its release was expanded to a wide theatrical release. The film grossed a total of USD$2,300,000 in the United States during its theatrical run. Data from the weekend of September 4, 1981 lists the film as number eleven at the box office, with a gross of $832,000 that week.

Home media
The film was released on VHS by Media Home Entertainment in 1982. It was later released on DVD by Anchor Bay Entertainment on August 31, 1999. This release featured an audio commentary with Linda Blair, producers Bruce Cohn Curtis and Irwin Yablans, and director Tom DeSimone; it also included television spots and the original theatrical trailer as bonus material.

On January 2, 2018, Scream Factory released the film for the first time on Blu-ray in a Collector's Edition set, which features four hours of new interviews, as well as the bonus materials contained on the 1999 Anchor Bay DVD.

Reception
Hell Night received mixed-to-negative reviews at the time of its release, though it has attained a cult following in the years since its release. On review aggregator Rotten Tomatoes, 62% of critics gave the film a positive review based on 13 reviews, with an average rating of 5/10. On Metacritic the film has a weighted average score of 36 out of 100, based on 4 critics, indicating "generally unfavorable reviews".

Time Out wrote "Amazing [...] what a competent director, cameraman and cast can do to help out a soggy plot", calling the film "tolerably watchable by comparison with the average Halloween rip-off. Ellen Farley of the Los Angeles Times likened the film to "Halloween with pop romance overtures."

Roger Ebert of the Chicago Sun-Times gave the film a one-star review, writing: "You know a movie is in trouble when what is happening on the screen inspires daydreams. I had lasted through the first reel, and nothing had happened. Now I was somewhere in the middle of the third reel, and still nothing had happened. By "nothing," by the way, I mean nothing original, unexpected, well-crafted, interestingly acted, or even excitingly violent." A review published by TV Guide noted the film contained "a few effective moments," adding: "Although the actual gore content is low, the titillation content is high, an avenue DeSimone would continue to explore in his future exploitation movies."

In his book The Gorehound’s Guide to Splatter Films of the 1980s (2003), film scholar Scott Stine wrote of the film: "Hell Night is one of those early '80s stalk 'n' slash quickies that—although almost universally despised at the time, despite the fact they made money—is actually quite endearing in retrospect.

Notes

References

Works cited
Blair, Linda; Curtis, Bruce Cohn; DeSimone, Tom; Yablans, Irwin (1999). Hell Night . Anchor Bay Entertainment.

External links
 
 

1981 films
1981 horror films
1980s horror thriller films
1981 independent films
1980s mystery films
1980s serial killer films
1980s slasher films
1980s teen horror films
American teen horror films
American haunted house films
American independent films
American monster movies
American slasher films
Films about fraternities and sororities
Films produced by Irwin Yablans
Films set in abandoned houses
Films set in country houses
Films shot in California
Films about fratricide and sororicide
Films about pranks
Films directed by Tom DeSimone
1980s English-language films
1980s American films